The 2011 census of Ireland was held on Sunday, 10 April 2011. It was administered by the Central Statistics Office of Ireland and found the population to be 4,588,252 people. Before the census, the latest population estimate was published in September 2010 and calculated that the Irish population had been 4,470,700 in April 2010. The previous census took place five years earlier, on Sunday, 23 April 2006. The subsequent census took place five years later, on 24 April 2016.

The 2011 census was held during the same year as the 2011 United Kingdom census in which the Northern Ireland Statistics and Research Agency administered a census of Northern Ireland, covering those areas of the island that are not part of the Republic of Ireland.

Preparation
The Central Statistics Office carried out a census pilot survey on 19 April 2009 to test new questions and methods for the 2011 census. The Irish government met on 11 December 2009 and scheduled the census to take place on 10 April 2011. The meeting also defined the questions that would be asked in the questionnaire.

Atheist Ireland and Humanist Association campaigns
There were also campaigns by the Atheist Ireland group, and by The Humanist Association of Ireland, asking people to consider carefully their answer to the question about religion.

Recruitment
The Central Statistics Office hired a temporary field force of 5,500 people. The recruitment was performed in a pyramid structure, with 50 senior managers, 440 field supervisors, and 5,000 enumerators hired in succession. Hiring of senior managers for the census took place between 29 April and 12 May 2010. Recruitment of 440 census field supervisor positions began on 16 September 2010. The supervisors worked from their own homes around the country for a six-month contract. The 5,000 census enumerator positions were advertised on 29 December 2010, and these worked for ten weeks from 8 March 2011.

Field work
Enumerators began a field campaign on 10 March 2011 to deliver about 1.8 million census forms to every household in Ireland in the month before Census Day. Following the census, the forms were collected between 11 April and 9 May 2011.

Questions on the census form

Results
The first statistics were released in the Preliminary Population Report on 30 June 2011. The population on Census Night in April was 4,581,269, a figure based on summary counts for each enumeration area compiled by enumerators on the front page of the census forms. This figure was 110,569 more than the estimated population for April 2010. The definitive census publication, based on the scanned and processed census forms, is to be published between March and December 2012.

County details
The population of each county in the Republic of Ireland recorded by the 2011 Census is listed below. The 26 traditional counties are ranked by population. Non-traditional administrative counties are indicated by a cream-coloured background.

References

External links
 This is Ireland: Highlights from Census 2011 Part 1 (134-page PDF), released 29 March 2012, containing much of the statistics
 Irish Census website
 Central Statistics Office website
 The census form
 How We Do It — Detailed census narrative from the Irish Census website
 Articles on the 2011 Census

Censuses in the Republic of Ireland
Census
Ireland
Demographics of Ireland
Geographic history of Ireland